Unanue may refer to:

People 
 Unanue family, the founders of Goya Foods
 Andy Unanue, American businessman
 Emil R. Unanue (born 1934), American immunologist
 Gustavo Adolfo de Unanue (born 1973), Mexican lawyer and politician
 Hipólito Unanue (1755–1833), Peruvian politician and scientist
 Joseph A. Unanue (1925–2013), American businessman
 Mikel Unanue (born 1982), Spanish curler

Other uses 
 Unanue, La Pampa, Argentina
 BAP Unanue (AMB-136), a tug of the Peruvian navy